This is a list of electoral results for the electoral district of Bulla and Dalhousie in Victorian state elections.

Members for Bulla and Dalhousie

Election results

Elections in the 1940s

Elections in the 1930s

Elections in the 1920s

 Two party preferred vote was estimated.

|- style="background-color:#E9E9E9"
! colspan="6" style="text-align:left;" |After distribution of preferences

 Preferences were not distributed to completion.

References

Victoria (Australia) state electoral results by district